Ross is the fourteenth studio album by American R&B singer Diana Ross, released on June 9, 1983 by RCA Records. It was Ross' third of six albums released by the label during the decade. It was released shortly before Ross gave a pair of free concerts in New York's Central Park. The album peaked at No. 32 on the US charts, No. 14 on the US R&B charts and No. 44 in the UK. The album's highest international chart position was in Sweden, where it reached No. 7.

Five of the eight tracks were produced by Gary Katz, two by Ray Parker Jr. and one by Ross. The album's first single, "Pieces of Ice", peaked at No. 31 on the US charts. Subsequent singles "Up Front" (US R&B No. 60, UK No. 79)  and "Let's Go Up" (US No. 77) – also recorded by Helen Reddy the same year – were also minor hits. "Up Front" was remixed by Jolley & Swain for its European release.

The album cut "You Do It" had previously been recorded by Sheena Easton and subsequently Rita Coolidge and Deborah Allen. The album's final US sales were slightly higher than 250,000 copies.

The album was remastered and re-released in September 2014 by Funky Town Grooves, as an "Expanded Edition" with bonus material.

Track listing

Personnel
Credits are adapted from the Ross liner notes.

 Diana Ross – lead vocals
 Michael McDonald – keyboards (1), backing vocals (1)
 Greg Phillinganes – keyboards (1–5), keyboard bass (4)
 Donald Fagen – synthesizers (2)
 David Paich – synthesizers (3, 5)
 Jullian Marshall – Hammond organ (3)
 Steve Porcaro – synthesizers (5)
 Ray Parker Jr. – acoustic piano (6, 7), synthesizers (6, 7), guitar (6, 7), bass (6, 7), drums (6, 7), backing vocals (6, 7), arrangements (6, 7)
 Rob Mounsey – Fender Rhodes (8)
 Ray Chew – acoustic piano (8) 
 Jimmy Haslip – guitar (1–5)
 Steve Lukather – guitar (1)
 Domenic Troiano – guitar (1–5)
 Larry Carlton – guitar (3, 4)
 Joe Walsh – guitar (4)
 Randy Hall – guitar (7)
 Bob Kulick – lead guitar (8)
 Eric Gale – guitar (8)
 Jeff Mironov – guitar (8)
 Neil Jason – bass (8)
 Jeff Porcaro – drums (1–5)
 Yogi Horton – drums (8)
 Ollie E. Brown – percussion (6, 7)
 Jack Ashford – tambourine (7)
 Jerry Hey – horn arrangements (1), trumpet (4), flugelhorn (4), synthesizer arrangements (5)
 Jim Horn – saxophone (4), flute (4)
 Gene Page – strings (6)
 Clydie King – backing vocals (1, 3)
 Shirley Matthews – backing vocals (1, 3, 5)
 Myrna Matthews – backing vocals (5)
 Alex Brown – backing vocals (6, 7)
 Anita Sherman – backing vocals (6, 7)
 Arnell Carmichael – backing vocals (7)
 J.D. Nicholas – backing vocals (7)
 Valorie Jones – backing vocals (7)

Production and Artwork
 Producers – Gary Katz (Tracks 1–5); Ray Parker Jr. (Tracks 6 & 7); Diana Ross (Track 8)
 Engineers – Daniel Lazerus (Tracks 1–5); Ray Parker Jr. (Tracks 6 & 7); Larry Alexander (Track 8)
 Assistant Engineers – Robin Lane, Michael Morongell and Eddie Orsario (Tracks 1–5); Michael Christopher, Steve Hallquist and Steve Rinkoff (Tracks 6 & 7)
 Additional Overdubs (Tracks 1–5) – Andy Hoffman and Wayne Yurgelun
 Digital Technician (Tracks 1–5) – Wayne Yurgelun
 Vocal Engineer (Tracks 6 & 7) – Andy Hoffman 
 Recorded at Soundworks Digital Audio/Video Studios, Media Sound and the Power Station (New York, NY); Sound City Studios and The Village Recorder (Los Angeles, CA); Ameracyan Studios (North Hollywood, CA)
 Tracks 1, 2, 3 & 5-8 mastered by Bob Ludwig at Masterdisk (New York, NY)
 Track 4 mastered by Ted Jensen at Sterling Sound (New York, NY)
 Cover Design – Ria Lewerke
 Photography – Uwe Ommer

Charts

References

External links

1983 albums
Diana Ross albums
Capitol Records albums
RCA Records albums
Albums produced by Gary Katz
Albums recorded at Sound City Studios